Jackknife may refer to:
 Pocket knife or jackknife, a compact, foldable knife
 Jackknife Bar, Portland, Oregon, U.S.
 Jackknifing, a type of crash with articulated vehicle combinations

Film and television
 Jacknife, a 1989 American film by David Jones
 "Jack Knife", an episode of NCIS
 Jackknife, a character on Superjail!

Athletics and sports
 Jackknife (exercise), an abdominal exercise
 Jackknife, a kicking move involving 540-degree rotation
 Jackknife, a type of high dive
 Jackknife hold, a pinning move in professional wrestling

Other uses
 Jackknife (statistics), a resampling technique in statistics
 Jackknife clam, common name for several species of bivalve mollusc

See also 
 Jackknife Bascule Bridge, a bridge in Thunder Bay, Ontario, Canada
 The Jack-Knife Man, a 1920 film